Wang Hao (born 17 October 1993) is a Chinese sprint canoeist.

He won a medal at the 2019 ICF Canoe Sprint World Championships.

References

1993 births
Living people
Chinese male canoeists
ICF Canoe Sprint World Championships medalists in Canadian
Asian Games medalists in canoeing
Canoeists at the 2018 Asian Games
Asian Games gold medalists for China
Medalists at the 2018 Asian Games